The Ministry of Defence of the Russian Federation has its own complex system of awards. This not only includes awards common to all the Armed Forces but also service specific and departmental awards subordinate to state awards. All awards herein were approved by orders of the Minister of Defence, these order numbers and inception dates are included as quick references to facilitate any further research.

Ministry of Defence

Medals
NOTE: The medals below are displayed in their proper order of precedence from top to bottom in accordance with the latest ministerial order of the defence ministry of the RF.

Decorations "For Merit"

Decorations "For Distinction"

Decorations for Service and Combat Duty

Commemorative Badges

Commendations

Decorations for excellence

Railway Troops of the Russian Federation
Russian Railway Troops were integrated into the Rear of the Armed Forces of the Russian Federation on 9 March 2004 by decree No. 314 of President Vladimir Putin.  Below are the awards specific to that service.

Medals

Decorations

Badges

Federal Agency for Special Construction (SpetsStroj Russia)

By order of Presidential decree 727 of 29 December 2016, the Federal Agency for Special Construction was stood down on 1 July 2017 as an independent entity and its organs were absorbed by the Ministry of Defence.

Medals

Badges

Federal Agency for the Safe Storage and Destruction of Chemical Weapons

The Federal Agency for the Safe Storage and Destruction of Chemical Weapons was subordinate to the Ministry of Defence.

Medals

Decorations

Emblems of Defence Ministry Entities

See also

Awards and decorations of the Russian Federation
Ministerial Awards of the Russian Federation
List of awards of independent services of the Russian Federation
Awards of the Ministry for Emergency Situations of Russia
Awards of the Ministry of Internal Affairs of Russia
Awards of the Federal Security Service of the Russian Federation
Awards of the Federal Protective Service of the Russian Federation
Honorary titles of the Russian Federation
Awards and decorations of the Soviet Union
Ministry of Defence (Russia)
Russian Armed Forces
Russian Ground Forces
Russian Navy
Russian Air Force
Russian Airborne Troops
Strategic Rocket Forces
Russian Space Forces
Russian Railway Troops
Internal Troops
Internal Troops (Russia)
Military history of the Russian Federation

External links
 State Awards of the Russian Federation - Official site  In Russian
 Official web site of the Ministry of Defence of the Russian Federation In Russian

References

Orders, decorations, and medals of Russia
Russian awards
Military awards and decorations of Russia
Russian Air Force
Russian Navy
Russian Space Forces
National symbols of Russia
Russian and Soviet military-related lists
Military of Russia